Endy Opoku Bernadina (3 May 1995) is a Dutch footballer who plays as a striker for SFC Opava. He was born to Curaçaoan father and a Ghanaian mother.

References

External links
 

1995 births
Living people
People from Boxtel
Dutch sportspeople of Ghanaian descent
Dutch people of Curaçao descent
Dutch footballers
Association football forwards
RKC Waalwijk players
FK Železiarne Podbrezová players
FK Dukla Banská Bystrica players
SFC Opava players
Eerste Divisie players
Slovak Super Liga players
2. Liga (Slovakia) players
Czech First League players
Expatriate footballers in Slovakia
Expatriate footballers in the Czech Republic
Dutch expatriate sportspeople in Slovakia
Dutch expatriate sportspeople in the Czech Republic
Footballers from North Brabant